Giuseppe Costa (6 April 1852 – 1912) was an Italian painter, active mainly painting genre scenes.

Biography
He was born in Naples, and trained in the local Academy of Fine Arts under Domenico Morelli. Among the titles of his works were The userer and his victims, Two orphan girls, Distraction, After work, Innocuous Love, Need and Modesty.

References

1852 births
1912 deaths
19th-century Italian painters
Italian male painters
20th-century Italian painters
Painters from Naples
Italian genre painters
Accademia di Belle Arti di Napoli alumni
19th-century Italian male artists
20th-century Italian male artists